The Bermuda national cricket team represents the British overseas territory of Bermuda in international cricket. The team is organised by the Bermuda Cricket Board (BCB), which became an associate member of the International Cricket Council (ICC) in 1966.

A Bermudian national team was first organised in 1891, when a tour of New York City arranged. In the years before World War I, Bermuda and American teams (including the Philadelphians) frequently exchanged tours, although it was not until 1912, when Australia toured, that the national team played a full international. After the 1920s, the focus of Bermudian cricket moved away from the United States towards the countries of the West Indies, although frequent tours from West Indian teams began only in the 1950s. The national team also played matches against international teams travelling to and from tours of the West Indies. However, only one of these games, against New Zealand in 1972, held first-class status.

The ICC Trophy (now the World Cup Qualifier) commenced in 1979 as the first World Cup qualifying tournament for ICC associate members. Bermuda made the semi-finals that year, and at 1982 edition made the final, losing to Zimbabwe. However, the side did not qualify for the World Cup, as it featured only one associate qualifier. By the time of the 2005 ICC Trophy, the number of associate qualifiers had been increased to six. By making the semi-finals that year, Bermuda qualified for the 2007 World Cup, becoming the smallest country to do so (both in terms of population and area). The team also received One Day International (ODI) and Twenty20 International (T20I) status until 2009. However, Bermuda performed poorly both at the World Cup and in subsequent ODI series, and after the 2009 World Cup Qualifier was relegated to the 2011 World Cricket League Division Two tournament. The team has since dropped three more divisions.

In April 2018, the ICC decided to grant full Twenty20 International (T20I) status to all its members. Therefore, all Twenty20 matches played between Bermuda and other ICC members after 1 January 2019 will be a full T20I. Later in 2019, Bermuda will play in the 2019–21 ICC Cricket World Cup Challenge League.

History

Beginnings
The first recorded cricket match to take place in Bermuda occurred on 30 August 1844. The Bermuda Cricket Club was formed one year later and had support from locals as well as British troops. Some international games were played against American sides, principally from Philadelphia in the late 19th century, but the cricketing strength of the island diminished greatly after the First World War. Indeed, the only significant tour in the inter-War years was a five-match tour by a team led by Sir Julien Cahn in 1933.

Post Second World War
After the Second World War cricket regained popularity in Bermuda, and many tours arrived, including some Test sides on the way to the West Indies. The first Bermudian tour of England took place in 1960 and more tours followed. Bermuda also is the place where the first non-Yorkshireman played for Yorkshire County Cricket Club. Yorkshire traditionally had a rule that no-one born outside the county could play for them, a rule abandoned in the 1990s. However, the rule was bent to allow Garry Sobers to play some games for them under the captaincy of Brian Close during a festival match in Bermuda.

In 1966 Bermuda was elected to Associate Membership of the International Cricket Council. A match against New Zealand in April 1972 was given first-class status. Since then they have competed in a wide range of international competitions including the ICC Trophy, a competition which was proposed by Alma Hunt, the Bermudian delegate to the ICC.

21st century

Rise, ODI status and the 2005 ICC Trophy (2004–2006)

In 2003 and 2004 they competed in the ICC Intercontinental Cup, playing in the same group as Canada and the United States. In 2004, the first running of the competition, they were knocked out after losing to Canada and drawing against the Americans. In 2005, they won the American group after beating Canada and the Cayman Islands in Canada. However, the semi-final against Kenya in October was lost.

Bermuda's greatest cricketing moment came on 7 July 2005 when they qualified for the semi-finals of the 2005 ICC Trophy. Qualification for the Semi-finals meant they won a place in the 2007 Cricket World Cup in the West Indies and that, from 1 January 2006 until the 2009 ICC World Cup Qualifier, they had official One Day International status.

Rapid decline and the 2007 Cricket World Cup (2006–2007)
Bermuda's first international engagement of 2006 ended in disappointment, when they lost every game on a five-match tour of the UAE. In April 2006 they hosted and took part in a Twenty20 tournament called the World Cricket Classic.

Bermuda played their first One-Day International in May 2006, and were successful in their first outing, beating Canada at the Queen's Park Oval in Trinidad as part of a triangular series which also included Zimbabwe. This made them the fourth team to win their first ODI, after Australia, New Zealand and Zimbabwe. However, Bermuda lost their second ODI, against Zimbabwe by 194 runs having conceded 338 for seven. They went on to lose the final, again against Zimbabwe.

In July 2006, they took part in the Stanford 20/20 knock-out tournament, but lost to Jamaica. They were given $100,000 for participating in the event. The following month they toured Canada, playing a four-day ICC Intercontinental Cup game and two ODIs. They lost the Intercontinental Cup game by nine wickets in a match that went into the final hour, but won both of the two ODIs. They are due to play Kenya and the Netherlands in their other Intercontinental Cup matches later that year. Also in August, they played in Division One of the ICC Americas Championship and went on to win the tournament for the first time, without losing a game. In November they visited Kenya for an Intercontinental Cup match and three ODIs. They drew the Intercontinental Cup match in a rain-affected game, and lost all three ODIs. They then went to South Africa, starting with an Intercontinental Cup game against the Netherlands. This was drawn, but highlighted by a record breaking innings from Glamorgan batsman David Hemp who scored 247 not out, the highest score in the history of the competition. This was followed by a triangular series against Canada and the Netherlands. They lost the first three games, but beat the Netherlands in the final, low-scoring game.

At the end of January 2007, Bermuda travelled to Kenya for the Division One tournament of the ICC World Cricket League. They lost 4 out of their 5 games: a 10 wicket loss to eventual champions Kenya, a 4 wicket loss to Ireland, losing by 56 runs to Canada (being bowled out inside just 16 overs) and losing by 8 wickets to the Netherlands; their only win coming against Scotland by 5 wickets. They finished bottom of the group, behind Ireland on net run rate (Bermuda with −1.310, Ireland with −0.061).

This was followed by a triangular series, played at the Antigua Recreation Ground in St. John's, Antigua, which saw Bermuda play Bangladesh and Canada. Their opening match was against Bangladesh where they posted 205/8 in their 50 overs, Lionel Cann top scoring with 33 off just 23 balls, however Bangladeshi opener Shahriar Nafees quickly silenced any thought of Bermuda pulling off a win, posting 104 not out and guiding Bangladesh home to an 8 wicket win.
After winning the toss and deciding to bat against Canada, Bermuda scored 206/8 from their 50 overs: an innings that was saved from collapse in large due to the partnerships between captain Irving Romaine and Saleem Mukuddem, for 57, as well as Lionel Cann and Delyone Borden, for 38. Cann top scored for Bermuda again, this time for 42 – notably off just 25 balls, including five sixes. Come the Canadian innings, opener Abdool Samad took to the crease in similar fashion to Nafees the day before. His 83 from 86 took Canada to 135/3, and well on the way to victory. Delyone Borden's spin bowling brought them back into the game – taking 4 wickets for just 33 runs, and reducing Canada to 179/6; but the tail end of Canada's batting order got them the 207 runs they required – with 6 overs to spare and losing just 1 more wicket – to finish on 207/7.

On 5 March Bermuda played England in St. Vincent. England were at 286–8 after the 50 overs thanks to a quick 76 by Jamie Dalrymple and with Ian Bell and Kevin Pietersen scoring 46 and 43 respectively. The Bermudian innings came to a close after just 22.2 overs with England claiming all 10 wickets with just 45 runs on the scorecard, with the highest runner getting 11. Jon Lewis claimed 3 wickets with James Anderson and Andrew Flintoff both getting 2.

Their second warm-up match was against Zimbabwe, also in St. Vincent. Bermuda won the toss and chose to bat, but soon started losing wickets. Janeiro Tucker scored 56, but was one of only 4 players to reach double figures before Bermuda were bowled out on the last ball of their innings for 136. Zimbabwe lost 2 wickets inside the first three overs, but Sean Williams top scored with 72 not out to reach their target of 137 in just 29 overs, losing just 4 wickets on the way.

After more than a year of unconvincing defeats, Bermuda's first appearance in the World Cup was unsurprisingly marked with 3 heavy defeats, having been drawn with Sri Lanka, India and Bangladesh. In their opening game they posted a meager 78 all out, chasing Sri Lanka's 321/6.

In their second game against India they struggled with the ball and India posted the highest total in World Cup history: 413/5. In response, David Hemp posted the maiden Bermudian half century in World Cup cricket with 76 not out. However, besides Hemp, the batsmen also struggled: the second highest scorer was Dean Minors with 21, and 5 of the 11 players were out for ducks.

Their final game, against Bangladesh, was hit heavily by rain: after originally being reduced to 41 overs a side it was ultimately decided that a maximum of 21 overs each could be played. Bermuda posted 94/9 in that time, with David Hemp top scoring again (with 23); but Bangladesh reached 96 in 17.3 overs, despite losing 3 quick wickets.

August saw them lose to Ireland and the Netherlands by huge margins in the 2007–08 ICC Intercontinental Cup, as well as an ODI series against the Netherlands. Between October and November they played the remainder of their Intercontinental Cup matches, against Kenya and the United Arab Emirates, as well as an ODI series against both nations. They finished last in the tournament.

Further decline and absolute collapse (2009–present)
The team then took part in 2009 ICC World Cup Qualifier where they finished 9th, and were relegated to 2011 ICC World Cricket League Division Two and qualified for 2009-10 ICC Intercontinental Shield. They lost heavily in the Intercontinental Shield.

Bermuda finished last in the 2011 ICC World Cricket League Division Two, thus relegating them to 2013 ICC World Cricket League Division Three. In April 2013 Bermuda hosted the 2013 ICC World Cricket League Division Three in which they came 4th. At the 2013 ICC World Twenty20 Qualifier Bermuda finished 14th with wins over Denmark and a surprise win over Scotland, with outstanding bowling from Jacobi Robinson. In the 2014 ICC World Cricket League Division Three, Bermuda capitulated against all teams, managing one win against Malaysia. They ended up coming last, thus relegating them to the 2016 ICC World Cricket League Division Four. In the space of less than six years, Bermuda went from being in the ICC World Cup Qualifier Division, to Division Four.

Bermuda progressed from 2018-19 Americas southern sub region qualifier to Regionals Finals in 2018.

International Grounds

Tournament history

Cricket World Cup

ICC World Twenty20 Qualifier
2008: 6th/6
2010: DNQ
2012: 13th/16
2013: 14th/16
2015: DNQ
2019: 13th/14
2022: DNQ

ICC World Twenty20 Americas Qualifier
2011: 3rd/6 (Q)
2013: 2nd/5 (Q)
2015: 3rd/4
2019: 2nd/4 (Q)
2021: 3rd/7

World Cricket League
2007 Division One: 6th place
2011 Division Two: 6th place – relegated
2013 Division Three: 4th place
2014 Division Three: 6th place – relegated
2016 Division Four: 4th place
2018 Division Four: 6th place – relegated

ICC Intercontinental Cup
2004: First round
2005: Semi-finals
2006: First round
2007–08: Last place (8th)
2009–10 (Intercontinental Shield): Last place (4th)

World Cup Qualifier
1979: Semi-finals
1982: Runners up
1986: 4th place
1990: Plate competition
1994: 4th place
1997: Won Plate competition (9th place)
2001: 9th place
2005: 4th place
2009: 9th place
2014: Did not qualify
2018: Did not qualify

ICC Americas Championship
2000: Runners up
2002: 4th place
2004: 3rd place
2006: Won (Division One)
2008: 2nd place (Division One)
2010: 3rd place (Division One)
2011: 3rd place (Division One)
2013: 2nd place (Division Two)

Players 
Squad for Oman ODI Series 1–13 December 2019

 Terryn Fray (captain)

 Rodney Trott (vice-captain)

 Derrick Brangman

 Justin Pitcher

 Zeko Burgess

 Dion Stovell

 Tre Manders

 Kyle Hodsoll

 Onias Bascome

 Okera Bascome

 Kamau Leverock

 Delray Rawlins

 Deunte Darrell

 Sinclair Smith

 Pierre Smith

Records and statistics

International Match Summary – Bermuda

Last updated 4 March 2023.

One Day Internationals
 Highest team total: 275/8 v Ireland, 31 January 2007 at Jaffery Sports Club Ground, Nairobi
 Highest individual score: 102*, David Hemp v Kenya, 6 April 2009 at Senwes Park, Potchefstroom
 Best individual bowling figures: 5/53, Dwayne Leverock v Kenya, 14 November 2006 at Mombasa Sports Club, Mombasa

Most ODI runs for Bermuda

Most ODI wickets for Bermuda

Highest individual innings in ODI

Best bowling figures in an innings in ODI

ODI record versus other nations

Twenty20 Internationals
 Highest team total: 239/6 v. Bahamas on 10 November 2021 at Coolidge Cricket Ground, Antigua. 
 Highest individual score: 103, Kamau Leverock v. Panama on 28 February 2023 at Belgrano Athletic Club Ground, Buenos Aires.
 Best individual bowling figures: 5/18, Allan Douglas v. Cayman Islands, 25 August 2019 at White Hill Field, Sandys Parish.

Most T20I runs for Bermuda

Most T20I wickets for Bermuda

T20I record versus other nations

Records complete to T20I #2012. Last updated 4 March 2023.

Coaching staff
Niraj Odedra was appointed head coach of Bermuda in June 2022, replacing interim coach Cal Waldron.

 Chairman of High Performance Committee: Gershon Gibbons
 Head coach:  Niraj Odedra
 Asst. coach:  Lorenzo Tucker
 Bowling coach:  Lorenzo Tucker
 Fielding coach:  Reginald Tucker
 Mental conditioning coach: Vacant
 Fitness trainer:  Nick Jones
 Head Physiotherapist: Danielle Richold 
 Masseur: n/a
 Performance analyst:  Lorenzo Tucker

See also

Bermuda women's national cricket team
Bermuda at the Cricket World Cup
List of Bermuda ODI cricketers
List of Bermuda Twenty20 International cricketers
Bermudian national cricket captains

References

External links
Official website – Online schedule, Statistics
Cricinfo page on Bermuda
CricketArchive index page for Bermuda

Cricket in Bermuda
National cricket teams
National sports teams of Bermuda
Bermuda in international cricket